is a Japanese manga series written and illustrated by Yukio Katayama. It was serialized in Kodansha's seinen manga magazine Monthly Morning Two from March 2018 to January 2020.

Publication
Written and illustrated by Yukio Katayama, Yoake no Ryodan was serialized in Kodansha's seinen manga magazine Monthly Morning Two from March 22, 2018, to January 22, 2020. Kodansha collected its chapters in four tankōbon volumes, released from August 23, 2018, to March 23, 2020.

Volume list

See also
Hanamote Katare, another manga series by the same author
Furo Girl!, another manga series by the same author

References

Further reading

External links
 

Dark fantasy anime and manga
Kodansha manga
Seinen manga